Jan Romocki codename: Bonawentura (17 April 1925 – 18 August 1944) was a Polish Scoutmaster (podharcmistrz), Second Lieutenant of AK-Szare Szeregi, poet and younger brother of fellow resistance figure Andrzej "Morro" Romocki.

Romocki was born in Warsaw, Poland and died in a hospital at 23 Miodowa Street in Warsaw during the Warsaw Uprising, after it was bombed by the Luftwaffe.

Awards
Cross of Valour (Krzyż Walecznych) - 4 August 1944
Silver Cross of the Virtuti Militari, Class V - 21 August 1944
Home Army Cross (Krzyż Armii Krajowej) - 16 July 1985

External links
Jan Romocki (1925-1944), pseudonim: 'Bonawentura' (Polish)

Warsaw Uprising insurgents
Polish resistance members of World War II
Polish Scouts and Guides
Polish Army officers
Recipients of the Silver Cross of the Virtuti Militari
Recipients of the Cross of Valour (Poland)
Recipients of the Armia Krajowa Cross
Resistance members killed by Nazi Germany
1925 births
1944 deaths
20th-century Polish poets
Polish civilians killed in World War II